Viljans Öga (Eye of the Will) is the third studio album from Swedish progressive rock group Änglagård, released after the band's near-20 year hiatus following 1994's Epilog. Although the album is instrumental, band members Johan Brand, Thomas Johnson and Anna Holmgren wrote short poems corresponding to each of the songs, which is also the source of the English translations of the song titles.

Track listing

Personnel
Änglagård
Jonas Engdegård – guitars
Johan Brand – bass and Taurus pedals
Thomas Johnson – pianos, Mellotrons and synths
Anna Holmgren – flute and saxophone
Mattias Olsson – drums, percussion and noise
Additional musicians
Tove Törnberg – cello
Daniel Borgegård Älgå – clarinet, bass clarinet, baritone saxophone
Ulf Åkerstedt – bass tuba, bass trumpet, contrabass trumpet

References

2012 albums
Änglagård albums